Dalla frontinia is a species of butterfly in the family Hesperiidae. It is found in Colombia, Peru and Venezuela.

Subspecies
Dalla frontinia frontinia (Colombia)
Dalla frontinia vanca Evans, 1955 (Peru)
Dalla frontinia venda Evans, 1955 (Venezuela)

References

Butterflies described in 1955
frontinia